"Glass Onion" is a song by the English rock band the Beatles from their 1968 double album The Beatles (also known as the "White Album"). The song was written by John Lennon and credited to Lennon–McCartney.

Lyrics
Lennon wrote the song to confuse people who read too much into the lyrical meanings of Beatles songs, which annoyed him. Many lines refer to earlier Beatles songs, including "Strawberry Fields Forever", "I Am the Walrus", "Lady Madonna", "The Fool on the Hill", and "Fixing a Hole". The song also refers to the "Cast Iron Shore", a coastal area of south Liverpool known to local people as "The Cazzy". Lennon dismissed any deep meaning to the mysterious lyrics:

"Glass Onion" was a name suggested by Lennon for the Iveys, a group who signed to Apple in 1968 and later became Badfinger.

Recording
The song was one of several recorded as a demo at George Harrison's Esher home in 1968 before the recording sessions for The Beatles. The Esher demo was first released on Anthology 3 (1996) and the 2018 deluxe edition of The Beatles. Anthology 3 also included an alternate version that contained various sound effects rather than the string arrangement.

This is the first track on The Beatles to feature Ringo Starr on drums. Starr briefly left the group during recording sessions for the album, and drums on both "Back in the U.S.S.R." and "Dear Prudence" were played by Paul McCartney.

Legacy
Coinciding with the 50th anniversary of its release, Jacob Stolworthy of The Independent listed "Glass Onion" at number 10 in his ranking of the 30 tracks on The Beatles. He wrote of the song: "Lennon embraced his cheeky side with 'Glass Onion', a self-referential track which parades as symbolic. Instead, it was designed to trick fans into thinking their songs meant more than they actually do." For the 50th-anniversary editions of The Beatles, a music video was created by Alasdair Brotherston and Jock Mooney.

The song served as a namesake for the 2022 film Glass Onion: A Knives Out Mystery and is featured in the film's end-credits.

Personnel
 John Lennon – double-tracked vocals, acoustic guitar
 Paul McCartney – bass guitar, piano, recorder
 George Harrison – lead guitar
 Ringo Starr – drums, tambourine
 Chris Thomas – recorder(?)
 George Martin – string arrangement including:
 Henry Datyner – violin
 Eric Bowie – violin
 Norman Lederman – violin
 Ronald Thomas – violin
 John Underwood – viola
 Keith Cummings – viola
 Eldon Fox – cello
 Reginald Kilby – cello
 Personnel per Ian MacDonald

References

Bibliography

External links
 
 

1968 songs
British psychedelic rock songs
The Beatles songs
Songs about the Beatles
Song recordings produced by George Martin
Songs published by Northern Songs
Songs written by Lennon–McCartney